A by-election was held for the Australian House of Representatives seat of Hunter on 9 April 1960. This was triggered by the resignation of Labor MP and former Opposition Leader H. V. Evatt. A by-election for the seat of La Trobe was held on the same day.

The seat was won by Labor candidate Bert James, the son of Evatt's predecessor Rowley James. The governing Liberal Party did not field a candidate, leaving as James' main opposition independent labor candidate Bob Brown, a shop-keeper and councillor on Cessnock City Council. He was apparently not related to the Bob Brown, who would win the seat as the endorsed Labor candidate twenty years later.

Results

References

1960 elections in Australia
New South Wales federal by-elections
April 1960 events in Australia